The Regency Council of the Kingdom of Poland was a semi-independent and temporarily appointed highest authority (head of state) in partitioned Poland during World War I. It was formed by Imperial Germany and Austria-Hungary within historically Polish lands in September 1917 after dissolution of the previous authority - Provisional Council of State (January - August 1917), due to oath crisis.

The council was supposed to stay in office until the appointment of a new monarch or regent. On 7 October 1918, the Regency Council declared the independence of Poland. That same month, the council took over the command of the Polska Siła Zbrojna armed forces.

History
The members of the Regency Council included: Cardinal Aleksander Kakowski, archbishop of Warsaw; Prince Zdzisław Lubomirski, president (mayor) of Warsaw; and landowner Józef Ostrowski, conservative politician, former chairman of the Polish Club in the Duma in St. Petersburg.

Together with the State Council and other branches of the government, the Regency Council exercised limited administrative powers, mainly in education and justice. In spite of this, Council made some crucial decisions, like creation of Dziennik Ustaw - most important polish publication of legal acts, still functioning.

On 7 October 1918, the council declared the independence of Poland from Germany and Austria-Hungary. On 11 November, it transferred it's military authority, and on 14 November the rest of authority to Józef Piłsudski, which led to dissolution of council the same day. Piłsudski served from 22 November as temporary chief of state of the newly independent Polish state

Prime Ministers
Jan Kucharzewski (November 26, 1917 – February 27, 1918)
Antoni Ponikowski (February 27 – April 3, 1918)
Jan Kanty Steczkowski (April 4 – October 23, 1918)
Józef Świeżyński (October 23 – November 5, 1918)
Władysław Wróblewski (November 5–11, 1918)

References

Further reading 

 Zdzisław Julian Winnicki, Rada Regencyjna Królestwa Polskiego i jej organy (1917 – 1918), Wrocław 2017 (in Polish)

1917 establishments in Poland
1918 disestablishments in Poland
Poland in World War I
Political history of Poland
Kingdom of Poland (1917–1918)